Gubbins is a surname. Notable people with the surname include:

Beatrice Gubbins (1878–1944), Irish artist in watercolour
Colin Gubbins KCMG, DSO, MC (1896–1976), prime mover of the Special Operations Executive (SOE) in the Second World War
George Gubbins (born 1935), retired Canadian jockey
James Gubbins Fitzgerald (1852–1926), medical practitioner, Irish nationalist politician and UK Member of Parliament (MP)
John Gubbins (1838–1906), Irish thoroughbred horse breeder, of Ard Patrick and Galtee More
John Harington Gubbins (1852–1929), British linguist, consular official and diplomat
Nathaniel Gubbins (1893–1976), British journalist and humourist
Nick Gubbins (born 1993), English cricketer

See also
Gubbins band, group of footpads, sheep-stealers, beggars, cutpurses, cut-throats and highwaymen who inhabited the area around Lydford in Devon around the time of the English Civil War
Gubbins, Hertfordshire